Suning Plaza may refer to:
Suning Plaza, Zhenjiang
Suning Plaza, Wuxi

See also
Suning (disambiguation)
 Sunning Plaza